Pat Beavan (born 27 May 1951) is a British former swimmer. She competed in the women's 200 metre breaststroke at the 1972 Summer Olympics.

References

External links
 

1951 births
Living people
Welsh female swimmers
British female breaststroke swimmers
Olympic swimmers of Great Britain
Swimmers at the 1972 Summer Olympics
Commonwealth Games gold medallists for Wales
Swimmers at the 1974 British Commonwealth Games
Commonwealth Games medallists in swimming
Place of birth missing (living people)
Medallists at the 1974 British Commonwealth Games